Angela L. Walker Franklin is an American academic who is the president of Des Moines University, Iowa, in office since 2011. She has a background in clinical psychology.

Franklin is originally from McCormick, South Carolina. She completed a B.A. in psychology at Furman University and then a Ph.D. in clinical psychology at Emory University, followed by an internship at Grady Memorial Hospital, Atlanta. In 1986, Franklin joined the Morehouse School of Medicine in Atlanta as an assistant professor of psychiatry. She eventually became the school's associate vice-president for academic affairs. In 2007, Franklin joined Meharry Medical College, Tennessee, as provost and executive vice-president. She briefly served as acting president in 2009. In 2011, Franklin was appointed president of Des Moines University, the first woman and the first African-American to hold the position. She published a memoir, An Unconventional Journey … An Unlikely Choice, in 2014.

References

People from McCormick, South Carolina
Emory University alumni
Furman University alumni
Morehouse College faculty
Des Moines University people
African-American academics
Heads of universities and colleges in the United States
Women heads of universities and colleges
American women psychologists
21st-century American psychologists
American academic administrators
Living people
Year of birth missing (living people)
American women memoirists
American memoirists
American women academics
21st-century African-American people
21st-century African-American women